Vaude may refer to:

 Nicolas Vaude (* 1962), a French actor. 
 VAUDE, a producer of mountain sports equipment
 Vaud, a canton of Switzerland